Boswellia dioscorides is a species of plant in the family Burseraceae. It is endemic to island Socotra, Yemen.  Its natural habitats are subtropical or tropical dry forests and rocky areas.

References

dioscorides
Endemic flora of Socotra
Threatened flora of Asia
Vulnerable plants
Taxonomy articles created by Polbot
Taxobox binomials not recognized by IUCN